The 2011 North Greenville Crusaders football team represented North Greenville University as an independent during the 2011 NCAA Division II football season. Led by Jamey Chadwell in his third and final season as head coach, the team compiled a record of 11–3. The Crusaders offense scored 561 points while the defense allowed 268 points.

Schedule

References

North Greenville
North Greenville Crusaders football seasons
North Greenville Crusaders football